York Historic District may refer to:

York Historic District (York, Maine), listed on the National Register of Historic Places (NRHP)
York Historic District (York, Pennsylvania), listed on the NRHP in York County, Pennsylvania
York Historic District (York, South Carolina), listed on the NRHP
York Historic District (Bellingham, Washington), listed on the NRHP in Whatcom County, Washington